William Herbert Davidson (September 2, 1905 – May 18, 1992, Elm Grove, Wisconsin) was president of Harley-Davidson Motorcycles from 1942 to 1971.  His father, William A. Davidson, was one of the company founders and his sons, John A. Davidson was a company president and Willie G. Davidson was a company vice-president.

In 1930 he won the AMA National Enduro Champion title.

Davidson was inducted to the Motorcycle Hall of Fame in 1999.

References

Harley-Davidson executives
University of Wisconsin–Madison alumni
American motorcycle racers
1905 births
1992 deaths
Place of birth missing